Carl Heins (8 June 1859 - 10 September 1923) was a German pianist, and a composer of light salon music in classical music style. He wrote both solo piano works and parlor songs.

Heins' pieces show a special pianoesque ability to fashion pretty melodies picturesquely in the salon style of the time. His competency on the keyboard led him to perform and compose. He composed the song 'Zwei Dunkle Augen', which was recorded by the tenor Fritz Wunderlich. Stylistically his music is similar to that of his older compatriot Carl Bohm.

Robert Leonhardt, an operatic baritone who sang with the New York Metropolitan Opera company between 1913 and 1922, made numerous recordings for many major record labels, both in Europe and in the United States. An early recording he made on Gramophone 42325 with matrix number 1113B[54] was "Zwei dunkle Augen" by Carl Heins. Leonhardt recorded it onto a 78rpm in October 1901 when he was 24.

Works

Im Hochland. Charakterstück (In Highland. Character Piece)
Village Idyll
Bärentanz (Dance of the Bear)
Senner Traum (Rêve du vache)
Slumber Song: The Widow to Her Child, for voice & violin
Die Spieluhr, (The Music Box). Bagatelle
SCHLIESS'IN DEIN HERZ MICH WIEDER EIN! Fantasie - transcription
Veilchen (Violets) Op.6
Am Weihnachtsabend (Christmas-eve) (Veille de Noel), Op.43
Rose D'or, Mazurka Brillante pour Piano, Op.106 No.3 
Gesang der Vöglein (Song of the Birds), Idylle for the Pianoforte, Op.120 
Gitana, Mazurka Brillante Op.156
Unter dem Weihnachtsstern (Round the Christmas-tree/Sous l'étoile de Noël), Salonstück für Pianoforte, Op. 160
Abschied von der Sennerin (Reapers Parting Kiss) Op.172
Am Feensee (By the fairy lake), Op.173
Hirtenidyll (Idylle de Berger), Op.174
Mädchentraum, Salonstück, Op. 176
Sommerlust- Summer's delight, Op.181, No.3
Rosenfee (The Rose Fairy), Mazurka-Caprice, Op.185
Rückkehr nach der Heimath (G dur). Op. 190/3. Werk Nr. 3 aus "Wanderleben. Vier melodiöse und instructive Characterstücke für Pianoforte". 
 Mignon Lyrisches Tonstück, op. 206, No. 1
Zwei Dunkle Augen (Two Dark Eyes), Op. 212
Morgenthau, (In the morning Dew), Op.245
Rotkäppchen (Little Red Riding Hood), Op.247
Aus Tyrol! From the Tyrol. Depart four Tyrol. Op. 281/5. Tyrolienne.

References

External links
 

19th-century German pianists
German composers
1859 births
1923 deaths